"Check Yes Juliet (Run Baby Run)" (often stylized as "Check Yes Juliet") is a song by American rock band We the Kings. It was released in February 2008 as the second single from their eponymous debut album (2007). The band also produced a music video for the song. The track is currently their biggest hit on Billboard charts, peaking at No. 70 on the Billboard Hot 100. In 2011, it gained "sleeper hit" status in Australia, where it peaked at No. 26 on the ARIA charts, being certified platinum by the Australian Recording Industry Association for the shipment of 70,000 copies. The song is featured in the 2009 rhythm-based video game Lego Rock Band.

Music video
The video was directed by Alan Ferguson. It portrays lead singer Travis Clark as Romeo "tossing rocks" at Juliet's window. Juliet's parents do not approve of Juliet's relationship with Clark, and, therefore, ordered Juliet to stay away from him. The video ends with Juliet sneaking out to see Clark perform at a house party and ultimately leaving with him. Juliet is played by Addison Timlin.

Track listing
Promo CD single
 "Check Yes Juliet" - 3:39

Charts
1 "Check Yes Juliet" charted in Australia in 2011, and was released as their first official single in the region for their Australian tour.

Certifications and sales

References

2007 songs
2008 singles
We the Kings songs
Song recordings produced by S*A*M and Sluggo
Songs written by Sam Hollander
Songs written by Dave Katz
Works based on Romeo and Juliet
Music based on works by William Shakespeare
Music videos directed by Alan Ferguson (director)